Àlvaro Crespi (born 20 March 1955 in Legnano) is a directeur sportif with the  cycling team. He was a professional from 1978 to 1980.

References

1955 births
Living people
People from Legnano
Directeur sportifs
Italian male cyclists
Cyclists from the Metropolitan City of Milan